William Horace Nunn (8 August 1891 – 4 February 1957) was a New Zealand rugby footballer who played both rugby union and rugby league.

Early life
Born in Rockhampton, Queensland, Australia in 1891, Nunn emigrated to New Zealand with his parents in about 1903, and worked as an iron moulder in Petone. He played cricket for the Petone club as a batsman and leg-break bowler, and was noted for being a good outfielder with a strong arm.

Rugby union
A "diminutive but nuggety" halfback, Nunn played for the Petone Rugby Club, and represented Wellington at a provincial level from 1912 to 1914, and the North Island in 1914. In 1914, he was controversially omitted from the All Blacks for their tour of Australia, the stated reason being that he had been certified as unfit for military service and could therefore not be considered for selection.

Rugby league
In 1923 began coaching the new Hutt rugby league club, and was appointed as of three selectors for the Wellington senior representative side. The Hutt side won the competition in their first year beating Petone who had won for several years by one competition point. The following year they finished 3rd under his tutelage. He also coached the Wellington representative team. In 1926 Nunn was elected as one of 10 vice-presidents of the Wellington Rugby League.

Nunn represented New Zealand on their 1921 tour of Australia, becoming Kiwi number 150.

World War I
Nunn enlisted as a private in F Company, 28th Reinforcements, New Zealand Expeditionary Force in February 1917, but deserted from camp at Trentham in May that year. Arrested in Dunedin in April 1920, he was found guilty by a district court-martial the following month and sentenced to one year's imprisonment with hard labour.

References

1891 births
1957 deaths
Sportspeople from Rockhampton
Australian emigrants to New Zealand
New Zealand rugby union players
Wellington rugby union players
Rugby union scrum-halves
New Zealand military personnel of World War I
New Zealand national rugby league team players
New Zealand rugby league players
Wellington rugby league team players
Rugby league five-eighths
New Zealand rugby league coaches
New Zealand rugby league administrators
Wellington rugby league team coaches
Petone Panthers players